William Tomkins  was an English politician who sat in the House of Commons in 1628 and in 1640.

Tomkins was the son of James Tomkins of Monnington on Wye, Herefordshire, and of Garnestone south of Weobley.

Tomkins' father was instrumental in bringing back the franchise for Weobley and Tomkins became one of the first Members of Parliament returned for the borough in 1628.  In April 1640, he was elected MP for Weobley  in the Short Parliament.

References

 

Year of birth unknown
Year of death unknown
People from Weobley
Place of birth unknown
English MPs 1628–1629
English MPs 1640 (April)